Live at the Warfield is a two CD album by the rock group Phil Lesh and Friends.  It was recorded live at the Warfield in San Francisco, California, on May 18 and May 19, 2006.

Live at the Warfield is also a concert performance DVD recorded at the same shows.  The track listing for the DVD is completely different from that of the album. The DVD was produced and directed by Jay Blakesberg and Bob Sarles. The director of photography was Bill Zarchy.

CD Track listing

Disc 1

"Shakedown Street"
"Mr. Charlie"
"Pride Of Cucamonga"
"Cosmic Charlie"
"Scarlet Begonias"
"They Love Each Other"
"Turn On Your Lovelight"
"Donor Rap"

Disc 2

"The Wheel"
"Dark Star"
"Morning Dew"
"I Know You Rider"
"The Other One"
"Dark Star"
"The Other One"
"Box of Rain"

DVD track listing

"Uncle John's Band"
"Eyes of the World"
"St. Stephen"
"The Eleven"
"Caution (Do Not Stop On Tracks)"
"All Along the Watchtower"
"New Speedway Boogie"
"Unbroken Chain"
"Help On the Way"
"Slipknot!"
"Franklin's Tower"

Personnel
Phil Lesh – electric bass, vocals
Joan Osborne – vocals
John Scofield – guitar
Larry Campbell – guitar, pedal steel, fiddle, mandolin, vocals
Greg Osby – saxophone
Rob Barraco – keyboards, vocals
John Molo – drums

Notes

Phil Lesh albums
2006 live albums
Live video albums
John Scofield live albums